is an eccentric, stony asteroid and binary system, classified as near-Earth object of the Amor group of asteroids, approximately 900 meters in diameter. It minor-planet moon, S/2001 (31345) 1, has an estimated diameter of 270 meters.

This asteroid was discovered on 3 August 1998, by the Lowell Observatory Near-Earth-Object Search (LONEOS) at Anderson Mesa Station, near Flagstaff, Arizona, United States.

Orbit 

 orbits the Sun at a distance of 1.2–2.8 AU once every 2 years and 10 months (1,046 days). Its orbit has an eccentricity of 0.39 and an inclination of 7° with respect to the ecliptic. A first precovery was taken at Palomar Observatory in 1978, extending the body's observation arc by 20 years prior to its official discovery observation at Anderson Mesa.

Close approaches 

It has made multiple close approaches to Earth, with the closest being 35,648,680 kilometers on 15 October 1978. With an aphelion of more than 2.8 AU,  is also a Mars-crosser.

Physical characteristics

Spectral type 

In the SMASS taxonomy,  is classified as a transitional Sq-type, which is an intermediary between the common stony S-type and the less frequent Q-type asteroids.

Diameter and albedo 

According to the 2006-published Photometric survey of binary near-Earth asteroids by Petr Pravec and derived data from the Collaborative Asteroid Lightcurve Link and the "Johnston's archive",  measures between 880 and 940 meters in diameter and its surface has an albedo of 0.18 and 0.20, respectively.

Rotation 

Lightcurve analysis gave a rotation period of 2.5 hours with a brightness variation of 0.1 magnitude.

A second lightcurve obtained and published in 2000, by an international collaboration of astronomers gave a rotation period of  hours with a brightness amplitude of 0.11 magnitude.

Moon 

During the second photometric observation, it was discovered that  is a probable/possible asynchronous binary system with a minor-planet moon orbiting it every 7.0035	hours, or twice this period solution.

The system has an estimated secondary-to-primary mean-diameter ratio of more than 0.3, which translates into a diameter of 270 meter for the satellite. The "Johnston's archive" also estimates that the moon's orbit has a semi-major axis of 1.4 kilometers.

For comparison, the Sun appears to be 0.5° from Earth.

Numbering and naming 

This minor planet was numbered by the Minor Planet Center on 30 November 2001. As of 2018, it has not been named.

Gallery

Notes

References

External links 
 MPEC 1998-P13 : 1998 PG, Minor Planet Electronic Circular 6 August 1998
 (31345) 1998 PG at E.A.R.N. – European Asteroid Research Node
 Asteroids with Satellites, Robert Johnston, johnstonsarchive.net
 Binary and Ternary Near-Earth Asteroids Detected by Radar, Lance Benner, JPL
 Asteroid Lightcurve Database (LCDB), query form (info )
 Dictionary of Minor Planet Names, Google books
 Asteroids and comets rotation curves, CdR – Observatoire de Genève, Raoul Behrend
 
 
 

031345
031345
031345
031345
19980803